Avenger is a political thriller novel by English writer Frederick Forsyth, published in September 2003.
It was adapted for television as the 2006 film Avenger starring Sam Elliott.

Plot summary
The first act of the novel introduces Calvin Dexter, the main character of the story.  Dexter is described as a lawyer in his early fifties with a passion for running triathlons to keep in shape.  The book digs into his past and reveals that he is a highly decorated Vietnam War veteran, and that his last tour of duty was as a tunnel rat, an extremely élite and secret task force that descended deep into the catacombs of Vietcong tunnels to hunt down the enemy in their own lairs. Dexter later married and had a daughter who at the age of 16 was lured away and forced into prostitution by Latino gang members and eventually murdered. Dexter hunts down his daughter's killers in Panama and executes them, then returns home only to discover that his beloved wife couldn't deal with the death of their only child and has committed suicide during his absence. He moves away and becomes only a small-town lawyer in his public face. But when the reason and price are right, he transforms himself into the "Avenger" and delivers justice not by killing criminals but by 'rendering' them to the United States, so that they will stand trial for their crimes against Americans.  Intertwined into the backstory of Calvin Dexter is the narrative of a young American volunteer from a very privileged family who was killed while delivering aid in Bosnia during the Bosnian War.

As the second act kicks into gear, the boy's grandfather, a Canadian billionaire named Stephen Edmonds, hires a tracker to discover the identity of his sole grandson's killer and eventually learns him to be Zoran Žilić, a sadistic hitman for Slobodan Milošević's government. The CIA had followed the movements of Žilić during the war, but let him slip off the radar after the fall of Milošević. Edmonds then learns of the services provided by the Avenger and hires him to pursue Žilić and bring him to trial. It is then revealed that a secret section in the CIA, headed by Paul Devereaux III, a dedicated patriot, has been working with Žilić in recent months with plans to use him as bait to eliminate another terrorist danger — Osama bin Laden himself. From the CIA’s point of view, Žilić, despite his horrific crimes, had been marginalised as a result of the end of hostilities in Bosnia and could be used to neutralise a much larger threat to the American way of life.

The third act details the actions of the "Avenger" as he tracks Žilić to his palatial and fully self-sufficient farm/compound in South America. Meanwhile, the CIA operatives work furiously to prevent the "Avenger" from nabbing Žilić. The Avenger is tipped off by an unknown ally that the CIA is onto him and outsmarts them at every turn.  He successfully manages to transport Žilić to Key West and into police custody. It is revealed in the aftermath that the person that tipped Dexter off was his Tunnel Rat partner from Vietnam, who is now Devereaux's deputy. Just as the story ends, the date is stated to be September 10, 2001.

2003 British novels
British novels adapted into films
Novels by Frederick Forsyth
Political thriller novels
British political novels
Novels set in Florida
Novels set in Panama
Novels set in Vietnam
Novels set in New York City
Novels set in New Jersey
Novels set in Ontario
Novels set in Virginia
British novels adapted into television shows
Cultural depictions of Slobodan Milošević
Bantam Books books